Keeper of the Seals of France was an office of the French monarchy under the Ancien Régime. Its principal function was to supplement or assist the Chancellor of France.  Its successor office under the Republic is the Keeper of the Seals, a title held by the Minister of Justice.

References 

Political history of the Ancien Régime
Court titles in the Ancien Régime
Offices in the Ancien Régime